Woolworth, Woolworth's, or Woolworths may refer to:

Businesses

American F.W. Woolworth Company and international descendants
 F. W. Woolworth Company, the original US-based chain of "five and dime" (5¢ and 10¢) stores
 Woolworths Group (United Kingdom), former operator of the Woolworths chain of shops in the UK, ceased trading and liquidated in early 2009
 Woolworths (Ireland), originally part of F.W. Woolworth, closed in 1984 
 Woolworth GmbH, the owner of the Woolworth chain of high street shops in Germany
 Woolworth Mexicana, originally part of F.W. Woolworth, operates a chain of small variety stores in Mexico
 Woolworths (Cyprus), originally part of F.W. Woolworth, sold off in 1985 and subsequently split
 Woolworths.co.uk, a defunct online retail company owned by "Shop Direct Group"

Woolworths Group and related business in Oceania
 Woolworths Group (Australia), the largest retail company in Australia and New Zealand; named after the American F.W. Woolworth company, but unrelated
 Woolworths New Zealand, the New Zealand arm of Woolworths Group
 Woolworths (New Zealand supermarket chain), a defunct New Zealand supermarket chain last owned by Woolworths Group
 Woolworths Supermarket, a chain of supermarkets in Australia owned by Woolworths Group

South African Woolworths Holdings Limited
 Woolworths Holdings Limited, one of the largest South African retail and supermarket chain stores; named after the American F.W. Woolworth company, but unrelated

People
 Frank Winfield Woolworth (1852–1919), American retail  entrepreneur, founder of the company that bore his name
 Charles Sumner Woolworth (1856–1947)  American retail entrepreneur, company partner and younger brother of the above
 Michael Woolworth (born 1960), American artist/printer

Buildings
 List of Woolworth buildings
 F. W. Woolworth Building (Lexington, Kentucky), a department store building in Lexington, Kentucky, U.S.
 Woolworth Building, New York City, U.S., a skyscraper
 Woolworth Building (San Diego), built in 1886, in San Diego, California, U.S.
 Woolworth Estate, Glen Cove, New York, U.S., the historic estate of Frank Winfield Woolworth

Places 
 Woolworth, Mississippi, a ghost town in Lincoln County, Mississippi, U.S.

Other uses
Escort carrier, also called a "Woolworth Carrier" by the Royal Navy
FP-45 Liberator, nicknamed the "Woolworth gun" due to its low quality

Lists
 List of Woolworth buildings
 List of Woolworth divisions and namesakes